The 5th IPC Ice Sledge Hockey World Championships took place in early 2009. The competition was divided into two tournaments, with Tournament B held from 15 to 21 March in Eindhoven, the Netherlands, and Tournament A held from 9 to 16 May in Ostrava, the Czech Republic. A total of thirteen teams participated; eight in Tournament A and five in Tournament B. The top six teams from Tournament A automatically qualified for the 2010 Winter Paralympics in Vancouver, British Columbia, Canada. The remaining two teams from Tournament A and the top two teams from Tournament B will play in the 2009 IPC Ice Sledge Hockey Paralympic Qualifier to determine who will take the remaining two Paralympic slots.

A Tournament
The A Tournament was held between the eight top-ranked national teams. The tournament was further divided into two groups of four teams each. Group A included Canada, the Czech Republic, Germany, Japan. Group B included Italy, Norway, South Korea, and the United States.

Final rankings

B Tournament

The B Tournament was held between five lower-ranked national teams: Estonia, Great Britain, the Netherlands, Poland, and Sweden.

Preliminary round

Final round

Third place game

Final

Final rankings

See also 
 :it:Campionato del mondo di hockey su slittino - Gruppo B 2009  (B-Pool results)

References

External links
 Game stats at pointstreak.com
 Results book – A-Pool

IPC Ice Sledge Hockey World Championships
World Para Ice Hockey Championships
International ice hockey competitions hosted by the Czech Republic
sled
Sport in Ostrava
International ice hockey competitions hosted by the Netherlands
2009 in Dutch sport
Sports competitions in Eindhoven
March 2009 sports events in Europe
May 2009 sports events in Europe
21st century in Eindhoven